The 2014 season was the Seattle Seahawks' 39th in the National Football League (NFL) and their fifth under head coach Pete Carroll. The Seahawks started the season as the defending Super Bowl champions for the first time in franchise history.

The season began with a 36–16 victory over the Green Bay Packers in their first meeting since the controversial Fail Mary Game. After struggling to a 3–3 record, which included a rare home loss to the Dallas Cowboys, they went on a 9–1 run to finish the season, which included a sweep of their division rivals, the Arizona Cardinals, who battled with them the whole season. They repeated as NFC West champions and finished in a three-way tie with the Packers and Cowboys for the NFC's best record, but earned the No. 1 seed based on tiebreakers, securing home-field advantage for the second consecutive season. This was the first time that a defending Super Bowl champion retained the No. 1 seed in the next season since the 1990 San Francisco 49ers. They were also the first team overall to repeat as the #1 seed in the NFC since the 2004 Philadelphia Eagles; and the first NFL team to do so since the 2013 Denver Broncos.

The Seahawks fielded the #1 rushing attack in the league with Marshawn Lynch finishing the year with 1,306 yards and a league leading 13 rushing touchdowns. In addition to Lynch, Russell Wilson had one of the most prolific running quarterback seasons ever with a career high 849 rushing yards and 6 rushing touchdowns along with a league leading 7.2 yards per attempt.

The Seahawks opened the playoffs with a win over the Carolina Panthers in the Divisional round, becoming the first defending champion since the 2005 New England Patriots to win a playoff game the following season. In one of the greatest comebacks in NFL history, the Seahawks advanced to Super Bowl XLIX by defeating the Green Bay Packers 28–22 in overtime after trailing 16–0 at halftime and 19–7 with less than three minutes left in regulation. In doing so, they became the first team since the 2004 New England Patriots to repeat as conference champions, the first NFC team since the 1997 Green Bay Packers to repeat as NFC Champions, the first team to go to consecutive Super Bowls as the #1 seed in the playoffs since the 1990–1991 Buffalo Bills, and the first NFC team to go to consecutive Super Bowls as the #1 seed in the playoffs since the 1982–1983 Washington Redskins. In Super Bowl XLIX, the Seahawks were defeated by the New England Patriots 28–24, thereby being dethroned and failed to become the first back-to-back champion since the 2004 New England Patriots, as well as the first NFC team to do so since the 1993 Dallas Cowboys. This was also the first time head coach Pete Carroll met his former team, the Patriots, and his successor, Bill Belichick in the Super Bowl, as Carroll was the Patriots head coach from 1997-1999, the last head coach before Belichick was hired in 2000.

Roster changes

Free agents

Draft

Notes
 The Seahawks traded their first-round selection (No. 32 overall) to Minnesota in exchange for their second- and fourth-round selection (Nos. 40 and 108 overall).
 The Seahawks traded the second-round selection (No. 40 overall) that they received from Minnesota, and their fifth-round selection (No. 146 overall) to Detroit in exchange for their second-, fourth-, and seventh-round selection (Nos. 45, 111, and 227 overall).
 The Seahawks traded their third-round selection (No. 96 overall), along with their 2013 first- and seventh-round selections to the Minnesota Vikings in exchange for wide receiver Percy Harvin.
 The Seahawks traded the fourth-round selection (No. 111 overall) that they received from Detroit, to Cincinnati in exchange for their fourth- and sixth-round selection (Nos. 123 and 199 overall).
 The Seahawks acquired an additional fifth-round selection (No. 146 overall) in a trade that sent quarterback Matt Flynn to the Oakland Raiders.
 The Seahawks traded their seventh-round selection (No. 247 overall) to the Oakland Raiders in exchange for quarterback Terrelle Pryor.

Undrafted free agents

Staff

Final roster

 Starters in bold.
 (*) Denotes players that were selected for the 2015 Pro Bowl.

Schedule

Preseason

Regular season

Bold indicates division opponents.
Source: 2014 NFL season results

Postseason

Standings

Division

Conference

Game summaries

Preseason

Week P1: at Denver Broncos

Week P2: vs. San Diego Chargers

Week P3: vs. Chicago Bears

Week P4: at Oakland Raiders

Regular season

Week 1: vs. Green Bay Packers
NFL Kickoff game

The Seahawks started their 2014 season at home against the Packers, the first meeting since the controversial 'Fail Mary' game in 2012.  With the win, they became the first defending Super Bowl champion team since 2011 (also Packers) to win their regular season opening game for a 1-0 start.

This is the first game in NFL history to end in a score of 36-16. In all five years that Pete Carroll was head coach of the Seahawks, so far, he has had at least one game end in a score never before achieved.

Week 2: at San Diego Chargers

This would be their largest margin of defeat since their 13-23 loss to the Cowboys in 2011.

Week 3: vs. Denver Broncos

This would be the first Super Bowl rematch (Super Bowl opponents in the previous year who face each other again in the current year) since 1997. Although the Broncos would rally in the 4th quarter to send the game into overtime, the Seahawks scored a touchdown in overtime to win. They entered their bye week at 2–1.

Week 5: at Washington Redskins

Percy Harvin had three touchdowns in this game negated by penalties. This was his penultimate game with the Seahawks.

Week 6: vs. Dallas Cowboys

The Cowboys defeated the Seahawks 30-23.  The Seahawks suffered only their second home loss since Russell Wilson became the starting quarterback at the start of the 2012 season (the other loss was to the Cardinals in Week 16 of the 2013 season).  Wilson struggled mightily, going 14/28 for only 126 yards with 1 rushing touchdown, 0 touchdown passes, and a game sealing interception.  The defense also gave up several big plays, including a 3rd and 20 first down conversion in the 4th quarter.  The conversion eventually led to a touchdown that put the Cowboys up 27-23.  The 30 points that were allowed by the Seahawks were the most they allowed in any home game in the Wilson era.  With the loss, the Seahawks fell to 3-2 on the season.

Week 7: at St. Louis Rams

Week 8: at Carolina Panthers

This was the first Seahawks road game to be televised by CBS since 2001, their last year in the AFC West.

Week 9: vs. Oakland Raiders

Week 10: vs. New York Giants

Week 11: at Kansas City Chiefs

Week 12: vs. Arizona Cardinals

Week 13: at San Francisco 49ers
Thanksgiving Day game

Week 14: at Philadelphia Eagles

Week 15: vs. San Francisco 49ers

With the win, not only did the Seahawks knock the 49ers out of the playoffs, but they also swept the 49ers for the first time since 2007.

Week 16: at Arizona Cardinals

With this win, the Seahawks completed a comeback against the Cardinals they started in week 12 from 3 games back in the division with 6 to play. They also swept the Cardinals for the first time since 2010.

Week 17: vs. St. Louis Rams

With this win, Seattle clinched the NFC West, a first round bye, and home field advantage throughout the playoffs for the second consecutive season.

Postseason

Seattle entered the postseason as the #1 seed in the NFC.

NFC Divisional Playoff: vs. #4 Carolina Panthers

The Seahawks defeated the Panthers 31-17, becoming the first defending Super Bowl champion to win a playoff game since the 2005 Patriots, and advanced to their second consecutive NFC Championship game.  They hosted the Green Bay Packers, who defeated the Dallas Cowboys 26-21.

NFC Championship Game: vs. #2 Green Bay Packers

After trailing 16-0 in the 3rd quarter and 19-7 with just over 2 minutes remaining, Russell Wilson, who threw 4 interceptions in the game, rallied Seattle to a much needed touchdown to bring the score to 19-14 with 2:09 left in regulation. The Seahawks then recovered an onside kick to re-gain possession of the football. After a relatively quick drive, Marshawn Lynch scored on a 24-yard touchdown run, making the score 22-19 after a successful 2-point conversion with 1:25 left. Aaron Rodgers then drove the Packers to the Seattle 30 yard line, where Mason Crosby kicked a 48-yard field goal to tie and send the game into overtime. Seattle then won the coin toss and drove 87 yards in 6 plays, capped by consecutive 35 yard completions, the first on 3rd-and-6 from the Seahawks own 30 yard line to Doug Baldwin, and the second a touchdown pass from Wilson to Jermaine Kearse to win the game 28-22. With the win, the Seahawks became the first defending champion to return to the Super Bowl since the 2004 Patriots. Additionally, they ended the Packers' season the same way it began, as they lost to the Seahawks at CenturyLink Field in the Kickoff Game.

Super Bowl XLIX: vs. #A1 New England Patriots

The game was a back and forth battle, but best remembered for Seattle throwing a game-sealing interception at the one-yard line on 2nd and 1 instead of going for a Marshawn Lynch rushing touchdown. The decision was highly scrutinized; Carroll stated "You've trained your players to do the right thing, and I trust them to do right."

References

External links
 

Seattle
Seattle Seahawks seasons
Seattle Seahawks
NFC West championship seasons
National Football Conference championship seasons